Alice Street is a street in the Brisbane CBD, Queensland, Australia. It is the most southern major road in the city's central business district, running parallel to the other female-named streets in the city. It was named after Princess Alice of the United Kingdom.

Geography 
In a pocket of land between a curve of the Brisbane River and Alice Street is the City Botanic Gardens and Parliament House. Access to the Gardens Point QUT campus and the Riverside Expressway is provided at the western end of the street.

The male-named streets from William Street to Edward Street end at intersections with Alice Street.

History 
Alice Street is one of the earliest streets in Brisbane.

Brisbane Ferries operated from the eastern end as early as the 1860s.

Heritage listings
Alice Street has a number of heritage-listed sites, including:
 69 Alice Street: Parliament House
 147 Alice Street: City Botanic Gardens
 210 Alice Street: Britannia Foundry
 2 Edward Street: Old Mineral House (corner of Alice Street)
 Sections of Albert St, George St, William St, North Quay, Queen's Wharf Rd,: Early Streets of Brisbane

Major intersections

 Riverside Expressway
 William Street
 George Street
 Albert Street
 Edward Street

See also

References

External links

 
Streets in Brisbane
Brisbane central business district